Polygonus leo, the hammock skipper, is a species of dicot skipper in the butterfly family Hesperiidae. It is found in the Caribbean Sea, Central America, North America, and South America.

Subspecies
The following subspecies are recognised:
 Polygonus leo arizonensis (Skinner, 1911)
 Polygonus leo pallida Röber, 1925
 Polygonus leo histrio Röber, 1925
 Polygonus leo leo (Gmelin, 1790)
 Polygonus leo hagar Evans, 1952

References

Further reading

External links

 

Eudaminae
Articles created by Qbugbot
Butterflies described in 1790